Western bank may refer to:

 Canadian Western Bank (CWB), a bank in Edmonton, Alberta, Canada
 Bankwest, a bank in Perth, Australia
 Westernbank, a bank in Mayagüez, Puerto Rico

See also
 
 Great Western Bank (disambiguation)
 West Bank (disambiguation)